Pine Inn, once called the Hotel Carmelo, is one of the early first-class Arts and Crafts, Tudor, Spanish style hotels established in Carmel-by-the-Sea, California. The Pine Inn is a historical resource dating back to 1889 when pioneer Santiago J. Duckworth built Hotel Carmelo. James Franklin Devendorf, renamed the hotel the "Pine Inn" in 1904. Today, it is a full-service hotel. The Pine Inn qualified for inclusion in the city's Downtown Historic District Property Survey, and was registered with the California Register of Historical Resources on March 18, 2003. The Inn is significant under the California Register criterion 1, as the first hotel in the history of the downtown district of Carmel-by-the-Sea.

History

Hotel Carmelo

In 1889, real estate developer and early pioneer of "Carmel City," Santiago J. Duckworth reserved five lots for the city's first hotel, called Hotel Carmelo. It was first located in the undeveloped section of town, at the corner of Ocean Avenue Avenue and Broadway (now Junipero Street), east of what became Devendorf Park. Back then, Broadway was envisioned as the main street. The two-story, American Craftsman style hotel was built by Delos Goldsmith for sales agent Abbie Jane Hunter, like a country inn, with wood from the old Tivoli Opera House in San Francisco. Hunter worked for real estate developer Duckworth. She used the hotel as her office, to welcome guests, and to sale lots. 

In 1890, trees were removed and an outline marked for the construction of Ocean Avenue heading up the hill. Visitors would take a horse-drawn carriage called the "Carmel Bus," from the Monterey train station to the town. They came to buy lots and stayed at the hotel. On July 4, 1891, a dance party was the first community event held at the hotel. In 1890, Duckworth printed a subdivision map, showing the hotel, cottages, and lots for sale.

Move and expansion

By 1903, Carmel-by-the-Sea's early founder and real estate developer, James Franklin Devendorf, put the hotel on pine logs and moved it down Ocean Avenue four city blocks closer to the Carmel beach to the corner of Ocean Avenue and Monte Verde Street. The old location became a livery yard, then the Village Inn, now a hotel called The Gateway.

Devendorf renamed the hotel the "Pine Inn" and renovated it. With the help of architect Thomas Morgan (brother of Mary DeNeale Morgan) and builder M. J. Murphy, Devendorf added a one-story roof entrance, sunroom and dining room looking west to the sea to the original two-story building. He also added a stable and a row of tents for extra lodging. Prospective buyers stayed at the Inn before decided on what lot to purchase. Early advertisements for the new Pine Inn began in the spring of 1903, with hotel rates at $8 per week. J. F. Devendorf was the contact person. 

Mary L. Hamlin became manager in 1909. Devendorf sold the Pine Inn in late 1911. By 1914, C.C. Belmont and his wife took over management of the hotel. He worked with Goold's livery, Leidig Bros. grocery, and Schweninger bakery to provide goods and services. When the Carmel Arts and Crafts Club put on Shakespeare plays and poetry readings at the Forest Theater, the Pine Inn became the recommended place to stay for students and their friends.

1920s and 1940s expansion
In the 1920s and 1940s, the Pine Inn went through important redesign and expansion that would include the entire city blcok. In 1922, John B. Jordan, an actor and scholar, purchased the hotel. He served eight years on the Carmel city council and two years as Carmel mayor (1926-1928). Jordan enlarged the hotel to include cottages offered for $15 to $30 a month, tennis courts, and putting greens. In 1928, a major remodel was designed by Blaine and Olson in a Spanish Revival style with a two-story 40-room addition on the Monte Verde side that connected to the main building. Builder M. J. Murphy did the construction for the remodel at a cost of $250,000.

Jordan sold the Pine Inn to William Harrison Godwin II in August 1940. Godwin and his brother, Frederick "Fred"  MacKaye Godwin, had learned the hotel business working for their aunt Agnes "Alice" D. Signor who owned the La Playa Hotel. 

In the 1940s, designer Jon Konigshofer remodeled the interiors of the Pine Inn in a Victorian style. Godwin added 12 retail stores, a rooftop garden for outdoor dining, newly decorated 55 bedrooms, and the Red Parlor Pub (now closed). Godwin sold the Pine Inn to Caroll McKee in 1962 and Godwin retired to Santa Barbara. In 1972, new owner Carroll McKee, added an open courtyard in the center with a glass gazebo dining. The current owners, Richard, and Mimi Gunner, purchased the hotel in 1986. They added Chinese and Pierre Dux French furnishings. The Il Fornaio Italian-themed fine dining restaurant was added to the main dining room.

See also
 List of hotels in the United States
 El Carmelo Hotel
 Timeline of Carmel-by-the-Sea, California

References

External links

 Official Website
 Pine Inn
 Downtown Conservation District Historic Property Survey

Hotels in California
Hotel buildings completed in 1889
Hotels established in 1889
1889 establishments in California
History of the Monterey Bay Area